The FIBT World Championships 1949 took place in Lake Placid, New York, United States. It marked the first time the championships took place outside Europe.

Two man bobsleigh

Four man bobsleigh
 

The US team led by Benham become the first non-Europeans to win a championship event.

Medal table

References
2-Man bobsleigh World Champions
4-Man bobsleigh World Champions

IBSF World Championships
International sports competitions hosted by the United States
Sports in Lake Placid, New York
1949 in bobsleigh
Bobsleigh in the United States 
1949 in American sports